Aparna Ghosh is a Bangladeshi actress, theater artist and model. She won Bangladesh National Film Award for Best Supporting Actress twice for her roles in the films Mrittika Maya (2013) and Gondi (2020).

Career
Ghosh debuted in the film Third Person Singular Number. She is involved with the theater groupe Nandikar since 2003. Her father, Alok Ghosh, is the team leader of Nandikar. In 2015, she starred as the title character in film Sutopar Thikana, playing Sutopa as a teenager, a married woman, a widow, and in old age. In 2017, Ghosh played the lead role of Farida in Bhuban Majhi.

Awards
 Anannya Top Ten Awards (2015)
 Bangladesh National Film Award for Best Supporting Actress (2013, 2020)
 Blender's Choice–The Daily Star Awards 2021 for Best Supporting Actor, Series (Female)

References

External links
 
 

Living people
Premier University alumni
Bangladeshi television actresses
Bangladeshi stage actresses
Bangladeshi film actresses
Bangladeshi female models
Best Supporting Actress National Film Award (Bangladesh) winners
Year of birth missing (living people)
Place of birth missing (living people)